General Ahmad Faisal Begzad, also called Ahmad Beig, is a former governor of Takhar Province. He assumed the role on 20 September 2012 and was previously the acting governor of Faryab Province. He left office in 2013 and became governor of Badakhshan in 2015.

References 

Governors of Takhar Province
Governors of Badakhshan Province
Year of birth missing (living people)
Living people
Place of birth missing (living people)
Afghan military officers
Governors of Faryab Province